Whale Rock Reservoir is a reservoir near Cayucos in San Luis Obispo County, California.

The reservoir was formed by the building of Whale Rock Dam on Old Creek by the Whale Rock Commission. It is a 193-foot (59 m) tall earthfill dam that was completed in 1961. The watershed has an area of 20.6 square miles (53 km2). It provides drinking water for the city of San Luis Obispo, the California Men's Colony, Cal Poly, and the Cayucos Area Water Organization. The water is brought to San Luis Obispo by the 17.6 mile (28 km) long, 30-inch (760 mm) diameter Whale Rock Conduit. There is an 800 kW hydroelectric plant at the end of the pipeline near Cal Poly.

See also
List of lakes in California

References
City of San Luis Obispo Utility Department

CSA 10 Water System Master Plan

Reservoirs in San Luis Obispo County, California
Reservoirs in California
Reservoirs in Southern California